Sticholotidini is a beetle tribe in the subfamily Sticholotidinae of the family Coccinellidae (ladybirds).

Genera 

Check: Limnichopharus – Protoplotina – Sasajiella

References

External links 
 
 
 

Coccinellidae
Polyphaga tribes